George Landow (1944 – June 8, 2011), also known as Owen Land, was a painter, writer, photographer and experimental filmmaker. He also worked under the pen names Orphan Morphan and Apollo Jize.

According to the film historian Mark Webber, Land made some of his first films as a teenager and his later films, made mostly during the 1960s and 1970s, are some of the first examples of the "structural film" movement. Land's films usually involve word play and have been described by Webber as having humor and wit that separates his films from the "boring" world of avant-garde cinema.

His work is also known to parody the experimental and "structural film" movement, as featured in his 1975 film Wide Angle Saxon.  His style of filmmaking is also inspired by Bertolt Brecht, educational films, advertising and television, and employs devices used by such in his films to destroy any  sense of "reality", as exhibited in What's Wrong With this Picture 1 and Remedial Reading Comprehension.

Shortly after the release of his film On the Marriage Broker Joke as Cited by Sigmund Freud... (1977), Landow rearranged his name to Owen Land. It is an anagram of "Landow N.E.". Land was the model for Robert Heinlein's character Jubal Harshaw, unbeknownst to Heinlein. 

The book Two Films By Owen Land (Lux, London) has the complete scripts of Landow/Land's films Wide Angle Saxon and On the Marriage Broker Joke as Cited by Sigmund Freud in Wit and its Relation to the Unconscious or Can the Avant-Garde Artist Be Wholed?, as well as footnotes written by Land interpreting the many references and elements of these two films and a filmography by Mark Webber. Released in May 2011, the book Dialogues - a film by Owen Land (Paraguay Press, Paris) has the complete script of his last film, as well as two interviews with the artist and essays written by Philippe Pirotte, Julia Strebelow and Chris Sharp.

Biography

Education, live theater and retrospectives
Land was born and raised in Connecticut, USA, and studied drawing, painting, sculpture, industrial design and architecture at Pratt Institute, Art Students League of New York and New York Academy of Art. He graduated with an MFA in painting from New York Academy of Art. He also studied acting and acting improvisation at Goodman Drama School and The Second City in Chicago. His music studies include classical and flamenco guitar, classical piano and music composition and Hindustani classical music at the Ali Akbar Kahn College of Music in San Rafael, California. He taught film production at the School of the Art Institute of Chicago, Northwestern University, San Francisco Art Institute and Art Center College of Design in Pasadena, California. He founded the Experimental Theater Workshop at The Art Institute of Chicago and wrote and directed several musical theater pieces, with original songs and music, including Mechanical Sensuality and Schwimmen mit Wimmen. Retrospectives of Land’s films have been held at the Edinburgh International Film Festival in Scotland, the Museum of the Moving Image in Astoria, New York, the International Film Festival Rotterdam in the Netherlands, the Tate Gallery in London, Kunsthalle Bern in Switzerland, and the Whitney Museum of American Art. Until his death, Land was represented by Office Baroque in Brussels, Belgium.

Death
Land was found dead in his Los Angeles apartment on June 8, 2011. His death was announced by Office Baroque on July 13, though the cause of death was not made public.

Filmography

Dialogues is informed by Land's study of folklore, myth and history, and the theology of all major religions, including Gnosticism and Kabbala. It ironically uses the form of the Platonic dialogue to explore the themes of reincarnation, art criticism and Tantra. It includes pastiches of badly-written well-known Hollywood films, as well as the films of Maya Deren, Stan Brakhage, Jim McBride and others. Dialogues was produced between January 2006 and August 2009 by Eric Michael Kochmer, Benjamin E. Pitts and Skye Le-fever.

References

External links
Office Baroque: Owen Land
 Writing on Owen Land (George Landow) by Fred Camper on the Web
 Reverence: The Films of Owen Land (a touring exhibition of his films)
 
 Owen Land (George Landow) on e-flux.com

American experimental filmmakers
1944 births
2011 deaths